Thomas, Tommy or Tom Sim(m)s may refer to:

Tommy Simms (Automatic Loveletter), musician
Tom Simms, character in Deranged (1974 film)
Tommy Sims, bassist in White Heart
Tommy Sims (American football), American football defensive back
Tom Sims, snowboarder and skateboarder
Thomas Sims, escaped slave

See also
Thomas Robertson Sim, botanist, bryologist, botanical artist and Conservator of Forests